Toyoaki is a masculine Japanese given name.

Possible writings
Toyoaki can be written using different combinations of kanji characters. Here are some examples:

豊明, "bountiful, bright"
豊朗, "bountiful, clear"
豊晃, "bountiful, clear"
豊章, "bountiful, chapter"
豊旭, "bountiful, rising sun"
豊亮, "bountiful, clear"
豊彰, "bountiful, clear"
豊昭, "bountiful, clear"
豊秋, "bountiful, autumn"
豊晶, "bountiful, sparkle"

The name can also be written in hiragana とよあき or katakana トヨアキ.

Notable people with the name
, Japanese wheelchair fencer.
 (1900–1948), Imperial Japanese Navy officer.

See also
, former village in Gunma Prefecture, Japan.

Japanese masculine given names